FC Istaravshan is a Tajik professional football club based in Istaravshan, that competes in the Tajikistan Higher League. The club was folded in 2013, but has since reformed.

History
In 2004, under the name "Uroteppa", finishing as Runners-up to Aviator Bobojon Ghafurov in the Tajik Cup whilst also finishing 6th in the Tajik League.

In 2012, the club's stadium underwent a $3 million renovation upgrading its capacity to 20,000 seats. The Istaravshan Sports Complex was officially re-opened on 27 October 2012 by Emomalii Rahmon, the President of Tajikistan.

At the end of the 2013 season, Istaravshan ceased to exist due to financial problems, being replaced by FK Daleron-Uroteppa in the Tajik League, after a failed merger between the two clubs.

On 14 March 2019, Tokhirjon Muminov was appointed as manager of Istaravshan.

Names
1938–1980: Spartak
1981–1991: Trikotazhnik
1992–1995: Istaravshan
1999     : Istaravshan
2003     : Istaravshan
2004     : Uroteppa
2009–    : Istaravshan

Domestic history

Current squad
''

References

External links
  Official club website
FK Istaravshan at Soccerway

Football clubs in Tajikistan
1938 establishments in Tajikistan